Joan of Arc is a 1999 Canadian two-part television miniseries about the 15th-century Catholic saint of the same name. The miniseries stars Leelee Sobieski as Saint Joan. A joint production of the Canadian Broadcasting Corporation and Alliance Atlantis Communications, it was shown internationally in 1999.

The miniseries received thirteen Primetime Emmy Awards nominations and four Golden Globe Award nominations.

Plot

The miniseries tells the story of Joan of Arc, from her birth in 1412 until her death in 1431.

Joan of Arc is born in 1412 in the village of Domrémy in the war zone of Northern France. During her youth, she often witnesses the horrors of war, and when 11 years old she starts hearing divine voices. Her spirit is kept high by the legend of the Maiden of Lorraine. This says that a young maiden one day will unite the divided country and lead the people to freedom.

At 17, Joan's village is invaded and burned, and her blind best friend, Emile, killed. She begs God to tell her what she said to deserve this, and the visions come back, telling her to travel to Charles, (rightful heir to the throne) and reunite France under his crown.

Joan leaves her small village to find Charles. She jumps into a livestock cart that is supposedly being taken to the king.  Instead she is taken to Vaucouleurs, where she is denied help to get to Charles. Here she finds refuge with a nun, who helps her unite the people of Vaucoleurs and build defenses against the English and Burgundian invaders. With this unification and defensework, rumor starts spreading that Joan is the Maid of Lorraine.

Although Joan doesn't seem to believe that she is The Maid, she goes along with it to give the people hope. After bringing the people together, the lord of Vaucouleurs finally gives her the tools she needs to find Charles.

Cast 
 Leelee Sobieski as Joan d'Arc
 Jacqueline Bisset as Isabelle d'Arc
 Powers Boothe as Jacques d'Arc
 Neil Patrick Harris as King Charles VII of France/The Dauphin 
 Maury Chaykin as Sir Robert de Baudricourt
 Olympia Dukakis as Mother Babette
 Jonathan Hyde as Duke of Bedford
 Robert Loggia as Father Monet
 Shirley MacLaine as Madame de Beaurevoir
 Peter O'Toole as Bishop Pierre Cauchon
 Maximilian Schell as Brother Jean le Maistre
 Peter Strauss as La Hire
 Chad Willett as Jean de Metz
 Ron White as Jean de Dunois
 Jaimz Woolvett as Duke of Burgundy (as Jaimz Wolvett)
 Ted Atherton as Jean d'Estivet
 Robert Haley as Georges de la Trémoille
 Matt Hoffman as Raymond 
 Justin Peroff as Pierre d'Arc 
 Chandra Engstrom as Young Joan

Awards and nominations

See also
 List of historical drama films

External links 
 

Canadian drama television films
English-language Canadian films
1990s adventure films
CBC Television original films
1999 television films
1999 films
Films about Joan of Arc
Films about capital punishment
Films directed by Christian Duguay (director)
Primetime Emmy Award-winning television series
Films set in the 15th century
1990s English-language films
1990s Canadian films